The Sălciuța is a left tributary of the river Arieș in Romania. It discharges into the Arieș in Sălciua de Jos.

References

Rivers of Romania
Rivers of Alba County